St. Paul's Methodist Church is a historic Methodist church off SC 9 in Little Rock, Dillon County, South Carolina. It was built about 1871, and is constructed of heart pine weatherboarding in a transitional Italianate Victorian vernacular style. A bell tower with octagonal steeple dominates the exterior of the church. Surrounding the church is the cemetery where many early church members are buried.

It was listed on the U.S. National Register of Historic Places in 1977.

References

Methodist churches in South Carolina
Churches on the National Register of Historic Places in South Carolina
Italianate architecture in South Carolina
Churches completed in 1871
19th-century Methodist church buildings in the United States
Buildings and structures in Dillon County, South Carolina
National Register of Historic Places in Dillon County, South Carolina
Italianate church buildings in the United States